Robert Corwin Lee (August 30, 1888 – September 1, 1971) was Vice President of the Moore-McCormack Lines, Inc.'s, shipping company, and an officer of the US Navy achieving the rank of Rear Admiral (lower half) in the US Naval Reserve.

Family
On June 15, 1918, he married Elsie Francis Calder, daughter of Senator William M. Calder.

Navy
Lee was promoted to the rank of Commander before leaving full-time service. Later, he was promoted to Rear Admiral (lower half) (Commodore)  in the US Naval Reserve, as a result of service during World War II.

Shipping
Lee was instrumental in negotiating several significant contracts for Moore-McCormack in the 1920s, with Poland and Russia.

Both his wife and daughter, Kay Calder Lee, were "sponsors" (launching ladies) for several ships:

Publications

 Mr. Moore, Mr. McCormack—and the seven seas! (New York: Newcomen Society in North America), transcript of 1956 Newcomen address(?), 32 pp.

References

1888 births
1971 deaths
United States Navy commodores